France was the host nation for the 1924 Summer Olympics in Paris.  It was the second time that France had hosted the Games, after the 1900 Summer Olympics, also in Paris. 401 competitors, 373 men and 28 women, took part in 128 events in 20 sports.

Medalists

Athletics

Seventy athletes represented France in 1924. It was the nation's sixth appearance in the sport as well as the Games. The French athletes won three bronze medals, in the team cross country, the high jump, and the steeplechase.

Ranks given are within the heat.

Boxing 

Sixteen boxers represented France at the 1924 Games; France was one of four nations to have two wrestlers in each weight class (along with Great Britain, Italy, and the United States). It was the nation's third appearance in the sport. Ces won France's only boxing medal with his bronze in the bantamweight.

Cycling

Eleven cyclists represented France in 1924. It was the nation's sixth appearance in the sport. Overall, the French cyclists won six medals, including four golds.

The French road cyclists, led by Blanchonnet, dominated the time trials. The French took both gold medals (in the team event and Blanchonnet in the individual), took three out of a possible four total medals, and had each of the four cyclists finish in the top ten individually. Hamel took the individual bronze.

In track cycling, the French team took two of the four gold medals. Michard won the sprint championship, while Cugnot and Choury won the tandem. Cugnot also earned a bronze in the sprint.

Road cycling

Ranks given are within the heat.

Track cycling

Ranks given are within the heat.

Diving

Twelve divers, nine men and three women, represented France in 1924. It was the nation's second appearance in the sport, and the first time France sent female divers. The fifth-place finishes by Lenormand and Raymond Vincent were France's best diving results to date.

Ranks given are within the heat.

 Men

 Women

Equestrian

Twelve equestrians represented France in 1924, tying France with Sweden for the most (and maximum) representatives in the sport. It was the nation's fourth appearance in the sport; France, Belgium, and the United States were the only three countries to have competed in each edition of the Olympic equestrian competitions to that point. Xavier Lesage won France's only equestrian medal in 1924, a bronze in the dressage. It was the first time that France finished with fewer than two medals, and the first time France did not earn at least a silver medal.

Fencing

24 fencers, 20 men and 4 women, represented France in 1924. It was the nation's fifth appearance in the sport. France won three gold medals and three silver medals, all in the six men's events. 11 of the country's 13 entries reached the finals; the sabre team Perrodon in the individual sabre were the only entries which did not get past the semifinals. In contrast, none of the four French women advanced to the final.

Ducret had the best results of any fencer in 1924, winning five medals. He took medals in all three of the individual competitions, including gold in the foil and silver in the other two events. Ducret was also on the two gold medal teams, for the foil and épée. Cattiau finished second to Ducret in the foil, with his only loss in 24 bouts being the loss to Ducret in the final pool (Ducret had won only 19 of his 24 matches on his way to the gold medal, but went 6 and 0 in the final pool).

 Men

Ranks given are within the pool.

 Women

Ranks given are within the pool.

Football

France competed in the Olympic football tournament for the fourth time in 1924.

 Round 1 Bye

 Round 2

 Quarterfinals

Final rank 5th place

Gymnastics

Eight gymnasts represented France in 1924. It was the nation's sixth appearance in the sport, matching Great Britain for most appearances to that point. The French team performed well, with two gymnasts in the top ten and the overall score for the eight gymnasts earning the nation a silver medal in the team competition.

The French swept the medals in the sidehorse vault apparatus, with Séguin's gold and two silvers after Gounot and Gangloff tied for second. Séguin also won silver in the rope climbing. Higelin took bronze in the horizontal bar. Despite Séguin's pair of apparatus medals, he finished 15th overall—and third among the French squad. Gounot, at eighth place, was the highest ranked French gymnast in the all-around.

Artistic

Modern pentathlon

Four pentathletes represented France in 1924. It was the nation's third appearance in the sport. France was one of six nations to have competed in each edition of the Olympic modern pentathlon to that time.

Polo

France sent a polo team to the Olympics for the second time in 1924. The French team lost all four of its matches in the round-robin tournament.

Ranks given are within the pool.

Rowing

23 rowers represented France in 1924. It was the nation's fourth appearance in the sport. France took three silver medals.

Ranks given are within the heat.

Rugby union

France sent a rugby team to the Olympics for the third time in 1924. The defending silver medalists won their first game against Romania, 61 to 3. After the United States also beat Romania, the three-team round-robin finished with the France-United States match. The Americans won the rematch of the 1920 game, 17 to 3, as France finished second again.

Ranks given are within the pool.

Sailing

Nine sailors, the maximum possible, represented France in 1924. It was the nation's fifth appearance in the sport; France was the only country to have competed in each edition of the Olympic sailing contests to that point.

Shooting

Twenty-two sport shooters represented France in 1924. It was the nation's sixth appearance in the sport; France was one of three countries (along with Denmark and Great Britain) to have competed in each Olympic shooting contest. French shooters took two medals: Coquelin won the gold in the prone rifle and was a member of the five-man team which took silver in the team rifle.

Swimming

Ranks given are within the heat.

 Men

 Women

Tennis

 Men

 Women

 Mixed

Water polo

France won its first gold medal in water polo in 1924, in its fourth appearance in Olympic competition in the sport.

Roster
 R. Bertrand
 Albert Delborgies
 Noël Delberghe
 Robert Desmettre
 Paul Dujardin
 A. Fasani
 Jean Lasquin
 Albert Mayaud
 Henri Padou
 L. Perol
 Georges Rigal

First round

Quarterfinals

Semifinals

Final

Weightlifting

Wrestling

Freestyle wrestling

 Men's

Greco-Roman

 Men's

Art Competitions

References

External links
Official Olympic Reports
International Olympic Committee results database

Nations at the 1924 Summer Olympics
1924
Olympics